Phalaenopsis aphrodite is a species of orchid found from southeastern Taiwan to the Philippines.

Subspecies
Phalaenopsis aphrodite subsp. aphrodite (the Philippines)
Phalaenopsis aphrodite subsp. formosana Christenson (Southeastern Taiwan)

References

External links
 
 

aphrodite
Orchids of the Philippines
Orchids of Taiwan
Plants described in 1862
Flora of Taiwan
Flora of the Philippines